Ravipadu is a village in the Guntur district of the Indian state of Andhra Pradesh. It is located in Pedanandipadu  mandal of Guntur revenue division.

Demographics 

 census, the village has population of 3815 of which 1851 are males and 1964 are females. Average Sex Ratio of the village is 1061 which is higher than Andhra Pradesh state average of 993. Population of children with age 0-6 is 254 which makes up 6.66 % of total population of village. Child Sex Ratio for the Pedanandipadu as per census is 827, lower than Andhra Pradesh average of 939. In 2011, literacy rate of Pedanandipadu village was 69.47 % compared to 67.02 % of Andhra Pradesh.

Government and politics 

Ravipadu gram panchayat is the local self-government of the village. It is divided into wards and each ward is represented by a ward member. The ward members are headed by a Sarpanch.

Education 

As per the school information report for the academic year 2018–19, the village has a total of 10 schools. These include one government, 3 Zilla Parishad/Mandal Parishad and 6 private schools.

See also 
List of villages in Guntur district

References 

Villages in Guntur district